The 1993–94 Belarusian Premier League was the third season of top-tier football in Belarus. It started on 17 July 1993, and ended on 18 June 1994. Dinamo Minsk were the defending champions.

Team changes from 1992–93 season
Two teams that finished at the bottom of 1992–93 season table (Obuvshchik Lida and Torpedo Zhodino) relegated to the First League. They were replaced by the winners of 1992–93 First League Shinnik Bobruisk and the league was reduced from 17 to 16 teams.

Belarus Minsk changed their name to Dinamo-93 Minsk prior to the season.

Overview
Dinamo Minsk won the championship for the 3rd time in a row as well as Belarusian Cup for the 2nd time and qualified for the next season's UEFA Cup, as the Champions League was limited to 24 highest-ranked European national leagues which didn't include Belarus. The Cup runners-up Fandok Bobruisk qualified for the Cup Winners' Cup. Stroitel Starye Dorogi finished in the last place and were relegated. It was their last season in Premier League to date.

Teams and venues

Table

Results

Belarusian clubs in European Cups

Top scorers

See also
1993–94 Belarusian First League
1993–94 Belarusian Cup

External links
RSSSF

Belarusian Premier League seasons
1994 in Belarusian football
1993 in Belarusian football
Belarus